Shoebox, shoe-box or shoe box may refer to:

Entertainment
"Shoe Box", a 1995 single by the Canadian band Barenaked Ladies
Shoebox (album), a 2014 album by the South Korean hip-hop group Epik High
"Shoebox", a song by Brie Larson from the 2005 album Finally Out of P.E.

Architecture
Dingbat (building)
Shoebox style, in architecture

Computing
Shoe-box system, an early fault-tolerant computer system architecture type by Tolerant Systems
IBM Shoebox, a 1961 computer that was able to perform math and perform speech recognition

Other
A box for storing shoes
Shoebox (originally Shoebox Greetings), a brand of humorous greeting cards by Hallmark Cards